Oracle Tower or Floreasca Tower, is an office building located in the city of Bucharest, Romania. It has 16 floors: 2 basements, a ground floor and 13 floors of offices, with a total surface of 10,000 m2. Construction started in 2003 and was completed in 2005.

Oracle currently operates space in the Oracle Tower of Bucharest.

External links

Skyscraper office buildings in Bucharest
Office buildings completed in 2005